Keezhtali Mahadeva Temple is an ancient Hindu temple dedicated to Shiva is situated in Kodungalloor of Thrissur District in Kerala state in India. The Keezhtali Mahadeva Temple is one of the important temples in Chera Kingdom. According to folklore, sage Parashurama has installed the idol of Shiva. The temple is a part of the 108 Shiva Temples in Kerala.
The temple is one of the four thali temples mentioned in the 108 Shiva temples (1. Tali Temple, Kozhikkode, 2. Kaduthruthy Mahadeva Temple, Kottayam, 3. Keezhtali Mahadeva Temple, Kodungallur, 4. Talikotta Mahadeva Temple, Kottayam). The temple is also known as the Keetholi Temple.

History
Ancient Kerala and its administrative structures have been carried out in certain temples known as Thalis. Keehi Thali, Arattali, Meltali, Nediyathali and Chingpuruthu Thali are five thali temples in the Ancient Chera Kingdom. These temples are a part of the 108 Shiva temples of ancient Kerala. The Melthali Temple is not yet known (or on a river)? Arathali is believed to be in the temples of Kottarithi near Thiruvanchikkulam.

Festival and daily pooja
There are three poojas here on a regular basis. (Usha pooja, Noon pooja and Athazha pooja). The shivaratri festival of the temple is usually celebrated in the month of Malayalam Kumbha (February - March).

Temple Structure
Keezhtali Mahadeva Temple is the largest Shivalinga temple in Kerala state. It is one of the few Hindu temples that were destroyed during the Mysore Sultan Tipu's campaign.

References

108 Shiva Temples
Shiva temples in Kerala
Hindu temples in Thrissur

ml:കൊടുങ്ങല്ലൂർ കീഴ്ത്തളി മഹാദേവക്ഷേത്രം